Robin Clarke (born 1964) is a retired New Zealand rower.

Clarke started rowing at age 13, and four years later, she was selected for the national rowing team.

At the 1986 Commonwealth Games in Edinburgh, Scotland, she won a gold medal in the women's double sculls with Stephanie Foster. Some weeks later at the 1986 World Rowing Championships at Nottingham in the United Kingdom, she won a bronze in the women's double sculls with Foster.

Clarke retired from rowing in 1997 when she was pregnant with twin boys.

References

1960s births
New Zealand female rowers
Living people
World Rowing Championships medalists for New Zealand
Commonwealth Games medallists in rowing
Rowers at the 1986 Commonwealth Games
Commonwealth Games gold medallists for New Zealand
20th-century New Zealand women
Medallists at the 1986 Commonwealth Games